Jill Casey DeSantis (née Black, born June 26, 1980) is an American former news journalist, television show host and the current first lady of Florida as the wife of Governor Ron DeSantis.

Early life and education
Jill Casey Black was born on June 26, 1980 in Troy, Ohio,  the second child of Robert Black, an optometrist and former officer in the United States Air Force and Jeanne Caponigro, a speech pathologist and the daughter of a Sicilian immigrant.

She graduated from the College of Charleston, where she received a Bachelor of Science in Economics with a minor in French.

Career

Television
Early in her career DeSantis hosted the Golf Channel programs On The Tee and PGA Tour Today. She was also a local newscaster and anchor for WJXT, an independent station in Jacksonville, Florida. She held several positions there, including general assignment reporter, morning anchor, and police reporter. She also did special reports, including for CNN.

In 2014, DeSantis was a creator-moderator for The Chat, an hour-long round table panel discussion talk show that aired on Tegna's Jacksonville stations WTLV (NBC) and WJXX (ABC). She hosted the daily local talk show First Coast Living as well as the weekly The American Dream program about entrepreneurs. DeSantis wrote and produced the television documentary Champion, The JT Townsend Story about high school football player J.T. Townsend.  She also won a regional Suncoast Emmy Award.

In 2018 Florida Politics called Casey "one of the most recognizable faces on Jacksonville television, with long runs at two local news operations."

First Lady of Florida

In February 2019, DeSantis established the First Lady's Medal for Courage, Commitment, and Service. Soon after, she announced Florida's 2019 Black History Month theme as "Celebrating Public Service" where she and the governor honored the winners of Florida's Black History Month student contests and Excellence in Education Award recipients at the Governor's Mansion. DeSantis recognized Mary Ann Carroll, the only female member of The Highwaymen, as Florida's featured artist for the month.

DeSantis participated in a Recovery Redfish Release to address the impacts of red tide. "I've heard from those throughout Florida who understand that our water must be safe for our families, visitors and economy." DeSantis has hosted listening sessions on Venezuela, hurricane relief, and mental health.

In August 2019, DeSantis presided over the first meeting of the Florida Children and Youth Cabinet as its chair.

Personal life
She met Ron DeSantis, then a naval officer at Naval Station Mayport, on a golf course. They married on September 26, 2009. They have three children together: two daughters and a son.

On October 4, 2021, her husband announced that she had been diagnosed with breast cancer. On March 3, 2022, she announced that she was cancer-free.

References

External links

1980 births
Living people
People from Troy, Ohio
American television talk show hosts
College of Charleston alumni
First Ladies and Gentlemen of Florida
Spouses of Florida politicians
Florida Republicans
Ron DeSantis